Vernon John Fredericks (born 7 July 1990) is a former New Zealand rugby union player who played for  in the Bunnings NPC competition. His position of choice was flanker.

Tasman
Throughout his years at the Mako, Fredericks made many appearances for the franchise and in 2017 he played in his 50th game for the side against  in a 27–29 win for Tasman. Fredericks made a further 6 appearances for the Mako before in Round 1 of the 2018 Mitre 10 Cup when the Mako played , Fredericks suffered a season ending injury after just eight minutes on the field.

Super Rugby
He came into the squad as a replacement for the injured Matt Todd and became Crusader number 213 with just seven minutes remaining in the match with the  having just scored a try. The Crusaders however did win the match 24-31.

References

External links

 itsrugby.co.uk profile

Rugby union flankers
New Zealand rugby union players
Tasman rugby union players
Crusaders (rugby union) players
Living people
1990 births